This is a list of areas in the Metropolitan Borough of Solihull, West Midlands, England.

 Bacon's End
 Balsall Common
 Barston
 Bentley Heath
 Berkswell
 Bickenhill
 Blossomfield
 Castle Bromwich
 Catherine-de-Barnes
 Chelmsley Wood
 Cheswick Green
 Coleshill Heath
 Copt Heath
 Cornets End
 Dickens Heath
 Dorridge
 Eastcote
 Elmdon
 Elmdon Heath
 Fen End
 Fordbridge
 Hampton-in-Arden
 Haslucks Green
 Hillfield
 Hobs Moat
 Hockley Heath
 Kineton Green
 Kingshurst
 Knowle
 Longdon
 Marston Green
 Meer End
 Meriden
 Monkspath
 Olton
 Sharmans Cross
 Shirley
 Smith's Wood
 Solihull
 Solihull Lodge
 Tidbury Green
 Ulverley Green
 Whitlocks End
 World's End

Solihull
Solihull
Solihull areas
Solihull areas